The name comet Bradfield may refer to one of these comets:

 C/1972 E1 (Bradfield)
 C/1974 C1 (Bradfield)
 C/1975 E1 (Bradfield)
 C/1975 V2 (Bradfield)
 C/1976 D1 (Bradfield)
 C/1976 E1 (Bradfield)
 C/1978 C1 (Bradfield)
 C/1978 T3 (Bradfield)
 C/1979 M1 (Bradfield)
 C/1979 Y1 (Bradfield)
 C/1980 Y1 (Bradfield)
 P/1984 A1 (Bradfield)
 C/1987 P1 (Bradfield)
 P/1989 A3 (Bradfield)
 C/1992 B1 (Bradfield)
 C/1992 J2 (Bradfield)
 C/1995 Q1 (Bradfield)
 C/2004 F4 (Bradfield)